The YoungStar Awards, presented by The Hollywood Reporter, honored young American actors and actresses from ages 6–18 in their work in film, television, stage and music. Winners were chosen via a poll of 3,500 entertainment industry insiders who read The Hollywood Reporter. The awards ceremony was held from 1995 until 2000; there was no ceremony in 1996.

First Annual YoungStar Awards

The First Annual YoungStar Awards were held in 1995.

Best Performance by a Young Actor in a Comedy Film

 Joseph Gordon-Levitt as Roger Bomman, Angels in the Outfield - won
 Jonathan Taylor Thomas as Ben Archer, Man of the House

Best Performance by a Young Actress in a Comedy film

 Christina Ricci as Kat, Casper

Best Performance by a Young Actress in a Drama Film

 Kirsten Dunst as Claudia, Interview with the Vampire

Best Performance by a Young Actor in a Drama Film

 Brad Renfro as Erik, The Cure - won 
 Elijah Wood as Stu Simmons, The War

Best Young Actor in a Comedy TV Series 

 Jonathan Taylor Thomas as Randy, Home Improvement - won
 Benjamin Salisbury as Brighton Sheffield, The Nanny

Best Young Actress in a Comedy TV Series 

 Madeline Zima as Grace Sheffield, The Nanny - won
 Nicholle Tom as Maggie Sheffield, The Nanny

Best Young Actress in a Drama TV Series 

 Claire Danes as Angela Chase, My So-Called Life

Best Young Actor in a Daytime TV Program

 Jonathan Jackson as Lucky Spencer, General Hospital

Best Young Actress in a Daytime TV Program

 Kimberly McCullough as Robin Scorpio, General Hospital

Second Annual YoungStar Awards

The Second Annual YoungStar Awards were held in 1997.

Winners are in bold.

Best Young Actor in a Comedy Film
 Alex D. Linz as Sammy, One Fine Day
 Brad Renfro as Huckleberry "Huck" Finn, Tom and Huck
 Jonathan Taylor Thomas as Thomas "Tom" Sawyer, Tom and Huck
 Elijah Wood as Sandy Ricks, Flipper
 Adam Zolotin as Louie Durante, Jack

Best Young Actress in a Comedy Film
 Mara Wilson as Matilda Wormwood, Matilda
 Rachael Leigh Cook as Becky Thatcher, Tom and Huck
 Gaby Hoffmann as Lane Dandridge, Everyone Says I Love You
 Natalie Portman as Laura Dandridge, Everyone Says I Love You
 Mae Whitman as Maggie Taylor, One Fine Day

Best Young Actor in a Comedy TV Series
 Joseph Gordon-Levitt as Tommy Solomon, 3rd Rock from the Sun
 Michael Fishman as D.J. Conner, Roseanne
 Marcus T. Paulk as Myles Mitchell, Moesha
 Benjamin Salisbury as Brighton Sheffield, The Nanny
 Jonathan Taylor Thomas as Randy Taylor, Home Improvement

Best Young Actress in a Comedy TV Series
 Tatyana Ali as Ashley Banks, The Fresh Prince of Bel-Air
 Kaitlin Cullum as Libby, Grace Under Fire
 Melissa Joan Hart as Sabrina Spellman, Sabrina, the Teenage Witch
 Brandy Norwood as Moesha Mitchell, Moesha
 Madeline Zima as Grace Sheffield, The Nanny

Best Young Actor in a Drama Film
 Lucas Black as Frank Wheatley, Sling Blade
 Jonathan Lipnicki as Ray Boyd, Jerry Maguire
 Joseph Gordon-Levitt as Oliver Laird, The Juror
 Joseph Perrino as Young Lorenzo "Shakes" Carcaterra, Sleepers
 Brad Renfro as Young Michael Sullivan, Sleepers

Best Young Actress in a Drama Film
 Claire Danes as Juliet, Romeo + Juliet
 Rae'Ven Larrymore Kelly as Tonya Hailey, A Time to Kill
 Anna Paquin as Amy Alden, Fly Away Home
 Natalie Portman as Lauren Gustafson, Heat
 Liv Tyler as Lucy Harmon, Stealing Beauty

Best Young Actor in a Drama TV Series
 Adam Wylie as Zach, Picket Fences
 Lucas Black as Caleb Temple, American Gothic
 David Gallagher as Simon Camden, 7th Heaven
 Cirroc Lofton as Jake Sisko, Star Trek: Deep Space Nine
 Ryan Merriman as Young Jarod, The Pretender
 Michael Yarmush as Arthur Read, Arthur (TV series)

Best Young Actress in a Drama TV Series
 Lacey Chabert as Claudia, Party of Five
 Jessica Bowman as Colleen Cooper, Dr. Quinn, Medicine Woman
 Kirsten Dunst as Charlie Chiemingo, ER
 Ashley Johnson as Katherine 'Kate' Moloney, Moloney
 Jennifer Love Hewitt as Sarah Reeves Merrin, Party of Five

Best Young Actor in a Daytime TV Program
 Jonathan Jackson as Lucky Spencer, General Hospital
 Justin Cooper as Lucas Jones, General Hospital
 Steven Hartman as Rick Forrester, The Bold and the Beautiful
 Tommy J. Michaels as Tim Dillon, All My Children
 Nicholas Pappone as Phillip Chancellor IV, The Young and the Restless

Best Young Actress in a Daytime TV Program
 Kimberly McCullough as Robin Scorpio, General Hospital
 Kimberly J. Brown as Marah Lewis, Guiding Light
 Gina Gallagher as Bianca Montgomery, All My Children
 Erin Torpey as Jessica Buchanan, One Life to Live
 Ashley Williams as Danielle Andropoulos, As the World Turns

Best Young Actor in a Mini-Series/Made for TV Film
 Haley Joel Osment as Davis, Last Stand at Saber River
 Freddie Findlay as Tsarevich Alexei, Rasputin: Dark Servant of Destiny
 Bug Hall as Eddie Munster, The Munsters' Scary Little Christmas
 Jonathan Jackson as Rudy Gatewick/Oliver Gillis, Prisoner of Zenda, Inc.
 Erik von Detten as Billy Jackson, Christmas Every Day

Best Young Actress in a Mini-Series/Made for TV Film
 Kirsten Dunst as Sara, The Siege at Ruby Ridge
 Hedy Burress as Linda Barrows, If These Walls Could Talk
 Ashley Johnson as Annie Warbucks, Annie: A Royal Adventure!
 Jena Malone as Ruth Anne 'Bone' Boatwright, Bastard Out of Carolina
 Nicholle Tom as Amy Dustin, For My Daughter's Honor

Best Young Actor in a Saturday Morning TV Program
 Luke Tarsitano as Fudge, Fudge
 Michael Galeota as Bailey Kipper, Bailey Kipper's P.O.V.
 Ben Gould as Nicky Farina, Saved by the Bell: The New Class
 Richard Lee Jackson as Ryan Parker, Saved by the Bell: The New Class
 Kyle Labine as Evan Ross, Goosebumps

Best Young Actress in a Saturday Morning TV Program
 Megan Parlen as Mary Beth Pepperton, Hang Time
 Samantha Esteban as Maria, Saved by the Bell: The New Class
 Shannon Chandler as Josephine "Jo" McCormick, Big Bad Beetleborgs
 Sarah Lancaster as Rachel Meyers, Saved by the Bell: The New Class
 Elizabeth Lund as Heather, Big Bad Beetleborgs

Best Young Recording Artist
 LeAnn Rimes, Blue

Third Annual YoungStar Awards

The Third Annual YoungStar Awards were held on November 8, 1998 at Universal Studios. The awards were hosted by Malcolm-Jamal Warner.

Winners are in bold.

Best Young Actor in a Comedy Film
 Cameron Finley as Beaver, Leave it to Beaver
 Jesse James as Spencer, As Good as It Gets
 Alex D. Linz as Alex Pruitt, Home Alone 3
 Gregory Smith as Alan, Small Soldiers
 Kevin Zegers as Josh, Air Bud

Best Young Actress in a Comedy Film
 Hallie Eisenberg as Marie, Paulie
 Hatty Jones as Madeline, Madeline
 Lindsay Lohan as Hallie & Ann, The Parent Trap
 Christina Ricci as Dede Truitt, The Opposite of Sex
 Mara Wilson as Anabel, A Simple Wish

Best Young Actor in a Comedy TV Series
 Joseph Gordon-Levitt as Tommy Solomon, 3rd Rock from the Sun
 Brandon Hammond as Matty, The Gregory Hines Show
 Jonathan Lipnicki as Alex, Meego
 Tahj Mowry as T.J. Henderson, Smart Guy
 Ben Savage as Cory Matthews, Boy Meets World
 Jonathan Taylor Thomas as Randy Taylor, Home Improvement

Best Young Actress in a Comedy TV Series
 Kaitlin Cullum as Libby, Grace Under Fire 
 Danielle Fishel as Topanga Lawrence, Boy Meets World 
 Larisa Oleynik as Alex, The Secret World of Alex Mack
 Madylin Sweeten as Ally, Everybody Loves Raymond
 Emily Mae Young as Lilly, Step by Step

Best Young Actor in a Drama Film
 Cameron Finley as Travis, Hope Floats
 Brandon Hammond as Ahmad Chadway, Soul Food
 Eamonn Owens as Francie, The Butcher Boy
 Jamyang Jamtsho Wangchuk as Dalai Lama, Seven Years in Tibet
 Elijah Wood as Leo, Deep Impact

Best Young Actress in a Drama Film
 Meagan Good as Cisely Batiste, Eve's Bayou
 Scarlett Johansson as Grace, The Horse Whisperer
 Christina Ricci as Wendy, The Ice Storm
 Jurnee Smollett as Eve Batiste, Eve's Bayou
 Mae Whitman as Bernice, Hope Floats

Best Young Actor in a Drama TV Series
 Andrew and Steven Cavarno as Owen, Party of Five
 David Gallagher as Simon Camden, 7th Heaven
 George O. Gore II as Gregory "G" Williams, New York Undercover
 Ross Malinger as Roland, Party of Five
 Austin O'Brien as Joshua Greene, Promised Land
 Michael Yarmush as Eric, My Life as a Dog

Best Young Actress in a Drama TV Series
 Jessica Biel as Mary Camden, 7th Heaven
 Lacey Chabert as Claudia, Party of Five
 Erika Christensen as Romy, Nothing Sacred
 Beverley Mitchell as Lucy Camden, 7th Heaven
 Caitlin Wachs as Chloe, Profiler
 Michelle Williams as Jen Lindley, Dawson's Creek

Best Young Actor in a Daytime TV Program
 Jonathan Jackson as Lucky Spencer, General Hospital
 Sean Marquette as Jamie Martin, All My Children
 Nicholas Pappone as Phillip Chancellor IV, The Young and the Restless
 Tyrone Savage as young Isaac Newton, The Inventor Specials: Newton
 Jeffery Wood as Jimmy Harrison, Sunset Beach

Best Young Actress in a Daytime TV Program
 Jessica Alba as Maya Graham, Flipper
 Camryn Grimes as Cassie Newman, The Young and the Restless
 Alexas Manta as Amanda, As the World Turns
 Robyn Richards as Maxie Jones, General Hospital
 Erin Torpey as Jessica Buchanan, One Life to Live

Best Young Actor in a Mini-Series/Made for TV Film
 Seth Adkins as Robbie, ...First Do No Harm
 Zachery Ty Bryan as John Scaduto, Principal Takes a Holiday
 Matthew Lawrence as Jesse, Angels in the Endzone
 Frankie Muniz as young Sammy, What the Deaf Man Heard
 Elijah Wood as the Artful Dodger, Oliver Twist

Best Young Actress in a Mini-Series/Made for TV Film
 Kirsten Dunst as Tina, Fifteen and Pregnant
 Tina Majorino as Avocet Abigail, Before Women Had Wings
 Jena Malone as Lily, Hope
 Chaz Monet as Ruby, Ruby Bridges

Best Young Actor in a Saturday Morning TV Program
 Ben Gould as Nicky Farina, Saved by the Bell: The New Class
 Phillip Van Dyke as Ned, 20,000 Leagues Under the Sea
 Scott Whyte as Chris, City Guys

Best Young Actress in a Saturday Morning TV Program
 Samantha Esteban as Maria, Saved by the Bell: The New Class
 Erica Luttrell as Emilie Robeson, The New Ghostwriter Mysteries
 Lindsey McKeon as Katie Peterson, Saved by the Bell: The New Class
 Megan Parlen as Mary Beth Pepperton, Hang Time
 Charlotte Sullivan as Camella Gorik, The New Ghostwriter Mysteries

Best Young Recording Artist or Musical Group
 Hanson, Middle of Nowhere
 Jonny Lang, Jonny Lang in Concert
 Monica, The Boy Is Mine
 LeAnn Rimes, LeAnn Rimes in Concert
 Usher, Usher

Fourth Annual YoungStar Awards

The Fourth Annual YoungStar Awards were held on November 7, 1999 at Universal Studios' Panasonic Theatre. The awards were hosted by Melissa Joan Hart and Donny Osmond. Proceeds benefited APLA's Skills for Teen AIDS Risk Reduction (S.T.A.R.R.) Program.

The show included a musical performance by Renee Olstead.

Winners are in bold.

Best Young Actor in a Comedy Film
 Dylan and Cole Sprouse as Julian, Big Daddy
 Eli Marienthal as Ricky Abramowitz, Slums of Beverly Hills
 Joseph Gordon-Levitt as Cameron, 10 Things I Hate About You
 Jason Schwartzman as Max Fisher, Rushmore
 Mason Gamble as Dirk, Rushmore

Best Young Actress in a Comedy Film
 Rachael Leigh Cook as Laney Boggs, She's All That
 Jessica Campbell as Tammy Metzler, Election
 Larisa Oleynik as Bianca Stratford, 10 Things I Hate About You
 Julia Stiles as Katarina, 10 Things I Hate About You
 Leelee Sobieski as Aldys, Never Been Kissed

Best Young Actor in a Comedy TV Series
 Zachery Ty Bryan as Brad Taylor, Home Improvement
 Benjamin Salisbury as Brighton Sheffield, The Nanny
 Michael Galeota as Nick, The Jersey
 Eric Lloyd as Little John, Jesse
 Justin Berfield as Ross, Unhappily Ever After

Best Young Actress in a Comedy TV Series
 Madeline Zima as Grace Sheffield, The Nanny
 Madylin Sweeten as Ally, Everybody Loves Raymond
 Larisa Oleynik as Alissa Strudwick, 3rd Rock from the Sun
 Mila Kunis as Jackie Burkhart, That '70s Show
 Azura Skye as Jane, Zoe, Duncan, Jack and Jane

Best Young Actor in a Drama Film
 Jonathan Jackson as Vincent, The Deep End of the Ocean
 Joseph Mazzello as John, Simon Birch
 Jake Gyllenhaal as Homer Hickman, October Sky
 Chris Owen as Quentin, October Sky
 Jake Lloyd as Anakin Skywalker, Star Wars: Episode I – The Phantom Menace
 Ryan Merriman as Sam, The Deep End of the Ocean

Best Young Actress in a Drama Film
 Jena Malone as Anna, Stepmom
 Natalie Portman as Queen Amidala, Star Wars: Episode I – The Phantom Menace
 Anna Paquin as Alison, A Walk on the Moon
 Heather Matarazzo as Grace O'Shea, 54
 Mika Boorem as Natalie, Jack Frost

Best Young Actor in a Drama TV Series
 Austin O'Brien as Joshua Greene, Promised Land
 Robert Iler as Anthony Soprano, Jr., The Sopranos
 Ryan Merriman as Young Jarod, The Pretender
 Marcus T. Paulk as Myles Mitchell, Moesha
 David Gallagher as Simon Camden, 7th Heaven

Best Young Actress in a Drama TV Series
 Mae Whitman as Sara, Chicago Hope
 Lacey Chabert as Claudia, Party of Five
 Jamie Lynn Sigler as Meadow Soprano, The Sopranos
 Sarah Rayne as Lexy Logan, Legacy
 Michelle Williams as Jen Lindley, Dawson's Creek

Best Young Actor in a Daytime TV Program
 Jonathan Jackson as Lucky Spencer, General Hospital
 Logan O'Brien as Lucas Jones, General Hospital
 Nicholas Pappone as Phillip Chancellor IV, The Young and the Restless
 Craig Lawlor as Adam Hughes, As the World Turns
 Joseph Cross as Casey Hughes, As the World Turns

Best Young Actress in a Daytime TV Program
 Amber Tamblyn as Emily Quartermaine, General Hospital
 Carly Schroeder as Serena Baldwin, Port Charles
 Erin Torpey as Jessica Buchanan, One Life to Live
 Ashley Cafagna as Kimberly Fairchild, The Bold and the Beautiful

Best Young Actor in a Mini-Series/Made for TV Film
 Adam Wylie as Jack, Michael Landon, the Father I Knew
 Adam Wylie as Charles, Balloon Farm
 Haley Joel Osment as Bobby, Cab to Canada
 Andrew Ducote as Brandon, Judgement Day: The Ellie Nesler Story
 Phillip Van Dyke as Luke, Halloweentown
 Ryan Merriman as Ben, Smart House

Best Young Actress in a Mini-Series/Made for TV Film
 Leelee Sobieski as Joan of Arc, Joan of Arc
 Evan Rachel Wood as Robin Garr, Down Will Come Baby
 Raven-Symoné as Nebula, Zenon: Girl of the 21st Century
 Tina Majorino as Alice, Alice in Wonderland
 Dominique Swain as Lolita, Lolita

Best Young Actor in a Saturday Morning TV Program
 Brandon Baker as Cray Blake, One World
 Tom Wade Huntington as Tony, Saved by the Bell: The New Class

Best Young Actress in a Saturday Morning TV Program
 Alisa Reyes as Marci Blake, One World
 Ashley Cafagna as Liz Miller, Saved by the Bell: The New Class
 Lindsey McKeon as Katie Peterson, Saved by the Bell: The New Class
 Megan Parlen as Mary Beth Pepperton, Hang Time

Best Young Recording Artist or Musical Group
 Hanson, Live from Albertane
 Britney Spears, ...Baby One More Time (album)
 Christina Aguilera, Christina Aguilera (album)
 Jonny Lang, Wander This World

Best Performance in a Voice Over Talent
 Rickey D'Shon Collins, voice of Vince, Recess
 Mae Whitman, voice of Little Susie, Johnny Bravo
 Adam Wylie, voice of Louis, The King and I
 Sam Gifaldi, various voices, Hey Arnold!
 Myles Jeffrey, voice of Easy, Babe: Pig in the City
 Michael Yarmush, the original voice of Arthur Read

Fifth Annual YoungStar Awards

The Fifth Annual YoungStar Awards were held on November 19, 2000 at the Wilshire Theatre in Beverly Hills. A celebratory dinner followed the event at Le Meridian Hotel. The event was produced by Dick Clark, Robert J. Dowling, Dawn Allen, Al Schwartz and Ken Shapiro. The awards were hosted by Mo'Nique, and presenters included B.B. Good, Amanda Bynes, Jane Kaczmarek, Bryan Cranston, and Michelle Trachtenberg. There were performances by No Authority, Rachael Lampa, Youth Asylum and Alecia Elliott. A portion of the proceeds went to the Starlight Children's Foundation.

Winners are listed in bold.

Best Young Actor in a Comedy Film

 Jonathan Lipnicki as George Little, Stuart Little
 Spencer Breslin as Rusty Duritz, Disney's The Kid
 Sam Huntington as Jeremiah 'Jam' Bruce, Detroit Rock City
 Malcolm Stumpf as Sam, The Next Best Thing
 Mark Webber as Hal Brandston, Snow Day

Best Young Actress in a Comedy Film

 Kirsten Dunst as Betsy Jobs, Dick
 Natalie Portman as Novalee Nation, Where the Heart Is
 Hallie Eisenberg as Young Little Miss Amanda Martin, Bicentennial Man
 Michelle Trachtenberg as Penny, Inspector Gadget
 Mara Wilson as Lily Stone, Thomas and the Magic Railroad

Best Young Actor in a Comedy TV Series

 Frankie Muniz as Malcolm, Malcolm in the Middle
 John Francis Daley as Sam Weir, Freaks and Geeks
 Shia LaBeouf as Louis Anthony Stevens, Even Stevens
 Eric Lloyd as Little John, Jesse
 Arjay Smith as Allen Strange, The Journey of Allen Strange

Best Young Actress in a Comedy TV Series

 Amanda Bynes, The Amanda Show 
 Mila Kunis as Jackie Burkhart, That '70s Show
 Danielle Fishel as Topanga Lawrence, Boy Meets World
 Sarah Hagan as Millie Kentner, Freaks and Geeks
 Alexa Vega as Wendy Stiles, Ladies Man

Best Young Actor in a Drama Film

 Frankie Muniz as Willie Morris, My Dog Skip
 Haley Joel Osment as Cole Sear, The Sixth Sense
 Michael Angarano as Nick, Music of the Heart
 Lucas Black as Peter Joseph Bullis, Crazy in Alabama
 Trevor Morgan as Nathan Martin, The Patriot

Best Young Actress in a Drama Film

 Kirsten Dunst as Lux Lisbon, The Virgin Suicides
 Thora Birch as Jane Burnham, American Beauty
 Kimberly J. Brown as Ava Walker, Tumbleweeds
 Jena Malone as Heather Aubrey, For Love of the Game
 Anne Suzuki as Young Hatsue Imada, Snow Falling on Cedars

Best Young Actor in a Drama TV Series

 Robert Iler as Anthony Soprano, Jr., The Sopranos
 Vincent Berry as Atticus Finch Henderson, Manhattan, AZ
 David Gallagher as Simon Camden, 7th Heaven
 Eric Lively as Carey Bell, So Weird
 Ryan Merriman as Young Jarod, The Pretender

Best Young Actress in a Drama TV Series

  Heather Matarazzo as Heather Wiseman, Now and Again
 Jamie Lynn Sigler as Meadow Soprano, The Sopranos
 Lacey Chabert as Claudia, Party of Five
 Cara DeLizia as Fiona 'Fi' Phillips, So Weird
 Evan Rachel Wood as Jessie Sammler, Once and Again

Best Young Actor in a Daytime TV Program

 Josh Ryan Evans as Timmy Lenox, Passions
 Jonathan Jackson as Lucky Spencer, General Hospital
 Billy Kay as Shayne Lewis, Guiding Light
 Justin Torkildsen as Rick Forrester, The Bold and the Beautiful
 Paul Wesley as Max Nickerson, Guiding Light

Best Young Actress in a Daytime TV Program

 Amber Tamblyn as Emily Quartermaine, General Hospital
 Ashley Tesoro as Kimberly Fairchild, The Bold and the Beautiful
 Camryn Grimes as Cassie Newman, The Young and the Restless
 Hayden Panettiere as Lizzie Spaulding, Guiding Light
 Mary Elizabeth Winstead as Jessica Bennett, Passions

Best Young Actor in a Mini-Series/Made for TV Film

 Seth Adkins as Pinocchio, Geppetto
 Blake Heron as Matt Kur, Cheaters
 Shawn Pyfrom as Danny Bonaduce, Come On Get Happy: The Partridge Family Story
 Will Rothhaar as Kip, An American Daughter
 Michal Suchánek as Danny Thorell, Aftershock: Earthquake in New York

Best Young Actress in a Mini-Series/Made for TV Film

 Alicia Morton as Annie, Annie
 Kaitlin Cullum as Eve Plumb, Growing Up Brady
 Kaley Cuoco as Maureen McCormick, Growing Up Brady
 Rae'Ven Larrymore Kelly as Dora Charles, Freedom Song
 Emily Mae Young, Santa and Pete

Best Young Actor in a Saturday Morning TV Program

 Ben Gould as Nicky Farina, Saved by the Bell: The New Class
 Brandon Baker as Cray Blake, One World
 Jon Lee, Miami 7

Best Young Actress in a Saturday Morning TV Program

 Alisa Reyes as Marci Blake, One World
 Lindsey McKeon as Katie Peterson, Saved by the Bell: The New Class
 Ashley Tesoro as Liz Miller, Saved by the Bell: The New Class

Best Young Recording Artist or Musical Group

 Charlotte Church, Voice of an Angel
 Billy Gilman, One Voice
 Hoku, Hoku
 Rachael Lampa, Live For You
 Mandy Moore, I Wanna Be With You

Best Performance in a Voice Over Talent

 Eli Marienthal, voice of Hogarth Hughes, The Iron Giant
 Lacey Chabert, voice of Eliza Thornberry, The Wild Thornberrys
 Spencer Klein, voice of Arnold, Hey Arnold!
 Hayden Panettiere, voice of Suri, Dinosaur
 Francesca Smith, voice of Helga Pataki, Hey Arnold!

Best Television Ensemble Cast

 Frankie Muniz, Justin Berfield, Erik Per Sullivan, Christopher Masterson and Craig Lamar Traylor, Malcolm in the Middle
 David Gallagher, Jessica Biel, Beverley Mitchell and Mackenzie Rosman, 7th Heaven
 Patrick Levis, Eric Lively, Cara DeLizia and Erik von Detten, So Weird
 Cameron Richardson, Antoinette Picatto and Michael Angarano, Cover Me
 John Francis Daley, Samm Levine, Martin Starr, Natasha Melnick and Sarah Hagan, Freaks and Geeks

Best Stage Performance by a Young Actor

Bix Bettwy as Boy in Shakespeare's Henry V at San Diego's Old Globe Theatre

Best Stage Performance by a Young Actress

Emily Hong as multiple roles in Broken Hearts at Los Angeles' Cornerstone Theater

YoungStar Starlight Award

 Christina Aguilera

References

Awards for young actors
Awards honoring children or youth